The Chairman of the Supreme Soviet of the Tajik Soviet Socialist Republic was parliamentary speaker.

Chairmen of the Supreme Soviet of the Tajik Soviet Socialist Republic

Chairmen of the Supreme Soviet of the Republic of Tajikistan

Chairman of the Supreme Assembly of Tajikistan

Sources

A Comprehensive Chronology of Central Asia, Afghanistan and Iran by Iraj Bashiri

See also 
President of Tajikistan
Supreme Assembly of Tajikistan

Political history of Tajikistan
Lists of legislative speakers in the Soviet Union
Tajik SSR
List
List